Josy Staudt (13 October 1904 – 19 June 1937) was a Luxembourgian gymnast. He competed in seven events at the 1928 Summer Olympics.

References

1904 births
1937 deaths
Luxembourgian male artistic gymnasts
Olympic gymnasts of Luxembourg
Gymnasts at the 1928 Summer Olympics
Sportspeople from Luxembourg City
20th-century Luxembourgian people